Verkh-Apshuyakhta (Apşıyaktı) is a rural locality (a selo) in Shebalinsky District, the Altai Republic, Russia. The population was 269 as of 2016. There are 3 streets.

Geography 
Verkh-Apshuyakhta is located near the Apshuyakhta River, 21 km southeast of Shebalino (the district's administrative centre) by road. Yelanda is the nearest rural locality.

See also

References 

Rural localities in Shebalinsky District